Santa Cruz is a populated place situated in Pima County, Arizona, United States. It is one of two locations in Arizona with this name, the other being the census-designated place in Pinal County.

References

Populated places in Pima County, Arizona